Frank Hayes may refer to:

Frank Hayes (actor) (1871–1923), American comic actor in silent films
Frank Hayes (unionist) (1882–1948), American labor leader; president of United Mine Workers of America, 1917–1920; Lieutenant Governor of Colorado
Frank Hayes (jockey) (1901–1923), American jockey
Frankie Hayes (1914–1955), American baseball player
Frank Hayes (cricketer) (born 1946), English cricketer
Frank Hayes (musician), American folk musician and information technology writer
Frank L. Hayes (1893–1967), American football and basketball player and coach
T. Frank Hayes (1883–1965), Lieutenant Governor of Connecticut

See also
Frank Hays (disambiguation)